Gandhi Institute of Technology and Management Hyderabad Campus (GITAM Hyderabad Campus) is a private institute located in Hyderabad, Telangana, India. It is one of three campuses of Gandhi Institute of Technology and Management. The campus admitted its first batch of students in 2009.

It has been accredited by NAAC with ‘A+’ grade and AICTE approved. ICRA, a rating agency, gives a national grade of "ICRA EB3 IN" and a state grade of " ICRA EB3+ AP" to the MBA program of Hyderabad Business School.

Workshop
The on-campus workshop houses the laboratories, which comply with UGC guidelines:
 Physical Laboratory
 Chemical Laboratory
 Networks Workshop
 Stores/Student needs
 Mechanical Laboratory
 Electrical Machines Laboratory
 Power electronics laboratory
 AEC laboratory
 EDC laboratory
 Concrete technology laboratory
 Computer sciences laboratory

University status
The Distance Education Council (DEC), New Delhi, on the recommendations of the Joint Committee of UGC-AICTE-DEC has accorded recognition to GITAM University for offering distance learning programmes from academic year 2009–10 vide letter F.No. DEC/Recog/2009/dt. 09-09-2009. The university offers 13 programmes through the distance mode.

Academics
The university offers courses in the fields of engineering, science, and business at undergraduate and postgraduate levels.

Schools
GITAM School of Technology
Hyderabad Business School
School of Science
GITAM School of Pharmacy
GITAM School of Architecture

Four-year undergraduate courses
 B.Tech. Electronics and Communication Engineering (with specializations in Artificial Intelligence & Machine Learning, and the Internet of Things).
 B.Tech. Electrical and Electronics Engineering
 B.Tech. Computer Science Engineering
 B.Tech. Civil Engineering
 B.Tech. Mechanical Engineering
 B.Tech. Aerospace Engineering
 B.Tech. Pharmacy

Six-year integrated dual degree courses
 BTech + MTech (Electronics and Communication Engineering)
 BTech + MTech (Mechanical Engineering)

Two-year postgraduate courses
 MBA (Master of Business Administration)
 MCA (Master of Computer Applications)
 MTech

Faculty
PhD, to start their career in the university. The faculty has industrial, research and teaching experience at national and international levels. Senior industry executives visit the campus to deliver guest lectures.

Library
The library (or Knowledge Resource Centre) has a collection of books, periodicals and monographs in the fields of engineering, technology, science and management. The library is divided into two wings, one for management studies and other for engineering studies.

Digital library
The campus contains a digital library with around 20+ computers.

Student life

Hostels
The campus has four hostels, two each for boys(A-Block, B-Block) and girls(A-Block, B-Block). These can accommodate 1600 students. An open gate system is maintained in hostels (only for boys).
Book

Transport
The university doesn't have own transportation, they are currently taking help of TSRTC to provide transport facility for Day-Scholars. 15 buses for the first year students and 40 for the rest of the students. Also, the university provides transport for the faculty members.

Student chapters
 Society of Automotive Engineers GITAM HYD chapter
 Electronics Students Technical Association (ECTA)
 IETE
 Association of Institution of Engineers
 Thrushna(Electrical department organisation)
ENGINEERS WITHOUT BORDERS- INDIA

Clubs
 Automophiles (SAE and Automobile Enthusiasts club)
 IEEE University branch.
 GITAM Aero Club
 KNOW Newsletter(college Magazine)
 Literary club, organizes skits, dramas, and role plays.
 Kalakriti
Innovation Center

College festivals

Kibbutz 2010
GITAM Institute of Management located at Rudraram in Medak district, organized Kibbutz 2010, a techno-management fest, in March 2010.

Kibbutz (ki-boots), a word of Hebrew origin, denotes 'a community settlement organized under collectivist principles' and connotes the spirit of working together as a team.

The competitive events of the fest included Blueprint Blues (business plan presentation), In 'Quiz' itive (quiz), Entre-prerana (entrepreneurship), Ad-X-press (advertisement designing), Tit 4 Tat (debating), Sea Program (programming and de-bugging), Chakra View (treasure hunt), Splurge (face painting), Dance-pe-Chance (dance), Dyno-Mike (singing), and Ishtyle-O-Meter (fashion show).

About 450 students from 75 colleges across the twin cities took part in the events.

Pramana
The annual techno-cultural-management fest of GITAM Hyderabad which is held in the first week of Feb every year. Pramana attracts 7000+ students from all across the country and is the largest fest in GITAM. It has witnessed some international stars like DJ Mariana Bo (Top 68 DJ in the World), Shaan, Zeaden, Sunburn Campus, VH1 Supersonic, The Lost Triplets, and some singers like LV Revanth, Yazin Nizar, Saketh Komanduri, Sony Komanduri and many more. The fest also has many events like Battle of Bands that featured the Threory Band.

References

External links
 GITAM website

2009 establishments in Andhra Pradesh
Engineering colleges in Hyderabad, India
All India Council for Technical Education
Educational institutions established in 2009
University and college campuses in India
Gandhi Institute of Technology and Management